is a compilation fighting game developed by Team Ninja and released by Tecmo for the Xbox in 2004. It is a collection of the two previous games in the series, 1996's Dead or Alive and 1999's Dead or Alive 2. It marks the first game in the series to be a compilation. DOA Ultimate contains a high-resolution edition of the Sega Saturn version of Dead or Alive, and an enhanced remake of DOA2 which utilizes a new graphics engine and offers Dead or Alive 3 game mechanics, new game content, and the inclusion of Hitomi as a playable character. The game offered online multiplayer capabilities, making the compilation among the first fighting games to offer online play. 

On December 16, 2006, both games became backwards compatible with the Xbox 360. On November 10, 2021, both games were made available to download on Xbox Live worldwide. On November 15, 2021, both games were added to the list of backward compatible games for the Xbox One and Xbox Series X/S.

Gameplay
Dead or Alive Ultimate is a compilation game that includes a remade version of Dead or Alive 2, with re-developed graphics and new stages for the Xbox gaming system. It also includes the original Sega Saturn version of the first Dead or Alive, with smoothed graphics, but lacks the additional content received in the later-released North American PlayStation version (no Bass or Ayane characters or extra costumes). Both editions include online play.

Dead or Alive 1 Ultimate is essentially identical to its original Sega Saturn version, and is generally considered more of a collector's disc than for its content. Dead or Alive 2 Ultimate, being a remake created after the debut of Dead or Alive 3, takes elements and mechanics from both its original iteration and successor. The action of 3D-axis movement is as free-formatted as DOA3, and Hitomi is now a playable character albeit outside story mode. Other elements have been kept intact from DOA2. These include higher damaging counters than in DOA3, environmental hazards not warranting a knockout on a character, and a counter mechanism that is much harder to execute. Despite being able to freely move on a 3D axis in the Ultimate version of DOA2 however, most moves cannot be sidestepped as in DOA3 and other 3D fighters. Another major change is in the revamped holding system in DOA2 Ultimate. The final major set of changes instituted in 2 Ultimate is the inclusion of slopes, which are a type of environmental hazard where those knocked down them roll down the slope, taking damage as they fall.

The game required Xbox Live in order to play online. The service's support makes it the second online console 3D fighting game to be released in America and Europe (Mortal Kombat: Deception having been the first) and the first online console 3D fighting game in Japan. The system set forth by Tecmo for online play in Dead or Alive Ultimate was intended to recreate the feel of playing at an arcade. Players would log onto a shared "lobby" and then observe other matches until it was their turn to participate. Each lobby has a set of gameplay parameters that is determined by its creator, allowing for tournament-style play.

While this game brings back the old mechanics of the Dreamcast version of Dead or Alive 2, some changes to the music and remixes were added. Each character except Hitomi (who was introduced in DOA3) has their own remix. The remixes only appear in the Dance Floor stage, The Ray House.

Plot
The story mode of Dead or Alive Ultimate plays out as it did in the original. However, a new CG sequence is added further explaining the relationship and history of Ayane, Kasumi and Hayate leading into the first two Dead or Alive games.

Development and release
In 2004, after the release of Dead or Alive 3, Team Ninja once again remade Dead or Alive 2, this time for the Xbox system. In the planning stages, this new game was originally named Dead or Alive Online for its addition of online support. On January 14, it was renamed to Dead or Alive Ultimate and promised fresh content, additional characters and an upgraded version of the original Dead or Alive for the Sega Saturn. According to Tecmo, the name change was due to the opinion that "Ultimate would more accurately describe the feeling players feel upon experiences with the game".

In Japan, Dead or Alive Ultimate was released with a crystal-clear blue version of the Xbox system that included a controller of the same color, a copy of Dead or Alive Ultimate, and some bonus Kasumi-themed extras. In the United States, two trading cards with character pictures on them were randomly included in each game as part of a collector's edition. The game disc of the North American release also contains the Booster Pack for Dead or Alive 3, which adds numerous character costumes and a new opening cinematic for the game. This disc also included a G4-produced segment from their Icons series detailing the history of the Dead or Alive series, along with interviews featuring various people from the video game industry, including series creator Tomonobu Itagaki.  A guide book titled Dead or Alive Ultimate: Prima Official Game Guide by Prima Games was released on November 4, 2004. With the December 14, 2006, backwards compatibility update for the Xbox 360, the Xbox release of Dead or Alive Ultimate can now be played on the Xbox 360. On November 10, 2021, Dead or Alive 1 Ultimate and Dead or Alive 2 Ultimate became available to download separately on Xbox Live worldwide, hinting at the addition of the games to backward compatibility program. On November 15, 2021, both games were added to the line up and became playable on Xbox One and Xbox Series X/S.

ReceptionDead or Alive Ultimate received generally favorable reviews. The game was awarded "Fighting Game of the Year" at the 2004 National Academy of Video Game Trade Reviewers Awards. It also received a runner-up position in GameSpot's 2004 "Best Fighting Game" category across all platforms, losing to Mortal Kombat: Deception.Dead or Alive Ultimate'' became the first fighting game to be included in the World Cyber Games.

References

External links
 

2004 video games
3D fighting games
Dead or Alive (franchise) video games
Fighting games
Video game compilations
Video game remakes
Video games developed in Japan
Xbox games
Xbox-only games
Tecmo games
Esports games
Multiplayer and single-player video games
Science fiction video games
Video games featuring female protagonists
Video games about ninja
Video games about revenge
Martial arts video games
Koei Tecmo games